Dean Lockhart is a former Scottish politician who served as Convener of the Net Zero, Energy and Transport Committee in the Scottish Parliament from 2021 to 2022. A member of the Scottish Conservative and Unionist Party, he was a Member of the Scottish Parliament (MSP) for the Mid Scotland and Fife region from 2016 to 2022.

Career

Born in Larkhall, South Lanarkshire, Lockhart attended his local primary and secondary schools before graduating from the University of Glasgow with a first class degree in Law.

After graduating, Lockhart worked in the City of London for 7 years, first as a financial journalist and then at a leading global law firm and separately at a leading global financial institution. He then moved to Asia and worked with businesses across Hong Kong, Singapore, Japan, China and India. He spent a year at the British Embassy in Manila acting as First Commercial Secretary, promoting British business interests in the Philippines and South East Asia. In 2001, he was elected as a partner at global law firm Linklaters, at that time becoming one of the youngest partners at the firm.  He also acted as Head of Business Development across Asia for  Linklaters with responsibility for business development, client strategy and Asia-wide country plans.

Scottish Parliament

In 2016, Lockhart stood for the Scottish Parliament as the Conservative candidate for Stirling where he came second, then was elected from the Mid Scotland and Fife regional list. In 2021, Lockhart again stood as the Scottish Conservative and Unionist candidate for Stirling where he came second, then was elected from the Mid Scotland and Fife regional list.

During his time in the Scottish Parliament, Mr Lockhart held the roles of Shadow Cabinet Secretary for the Economy, Jobs and Fair Work (2016-2019)  Shadow Cabinet Secretary for Infrastructure, Transport and Business (2019-20)  and Shadow Cabinet Secretary for Constitution, Europe and External Affairs (2020-2021) 

Mr Lockhart convened the Net Zero, Energy and Transport Committee in the Scottish Parliament 

Mr Lockhart was also the Convenor of the Cross Party Group (CPG) on Japan. Dean is also the Convenor of the Cross Party Group (CPG) on China, Cross Party Group (CPG) on Japan, the Convenor of the Cross Party Group (CPG) on USA. and the Deputy Convenor of the Cross Party Group (CPG) on Germany.

Lockhart resigned from the Scottish Parliament in 2022 to pursue a career in business. He was replaced by Roz McCall.

References

External links 
 

Year of birth missing (living people)
Living people
Place of birth missing (living people)
Alumni of the University of Glasgow
Scottish solicitors
British diplomats
Conservative MSPs
Members of the Scottish Parliament 2016–2021
Members of the Scottish Parliament 2021–2026